Yvette Renee Simpson (born August 2, 1978) is an American politician, lawyer, former member of the Cincinnati City Council. She is the former chief executive of Democracy for America.

Education 
Simpson received an undergraduate degree from Miami University, a J.D. degree from the University of Cincinnati, and an M.B.A. from Xavier University.

Political career 
She was sworn into the Cincinnati City Council in 2011, which led to the Council having its first African-American majority.

Simpson unsuccessfully challenged incumbent Mayor John Cranley in the 2017 Cincinnati mayoral election. She received a greater percentage of the votes in the primary (45%) than her top competitors Cranley (35%) or Rob Richardson Jr. (20%). She lost in the general election, Cranley (53.95%) Simpson (46.05%), against incumbent Mayor John Cranley in the 2017 Cincinnati mayoral election.

Democracy for America 
On January 1, 2019, Simpson became chief executive of Democracy for America, a national progressive grassroots organizing group founded by former presidential candidate Howard Dean. She is the group's first ever female chief executive. Simpson announced she would step down from the position in 2022. She resigned from DfA on 7 December 2022 as the organization neared bankruptcy.

Personal life 
In June 2019, she became a political news contributor with ABC.

References

1978 births
Living people
Cincinnati City Council members
Ohio Democrats
Ohio lawyers
21st-century American politicians
Women city councillors in Ohio
African-American city council members in Ohio
Miami University alumni
Xavier University alumni
University of Cincinnati College of Law alumni
21st-century American women politicians
21st-century African-American women
21st-century African-American politicians
20th-century African-American people
20th-century African-American women